Al-Jeel Club is a Saudi Arabian football club based in Hofuf, Al-Hasa. Founded in 1976, the club competes in the MS League , the second tier of Saudi football. Al-Jeel play their home games at the Prince Abdullah bin Jalawi Stadium in Al-Hasa. Al-Jeel have finished as runners-up in the Saudi Second Division twice in 1986 and 2010.

Al-Jeel's first president was Saleh Al-Dhafer and its first manager was Sameer Hajjaj. The club was previously known as Al-Okhowa before changing their name to Al-Jeel.

Honours
Saudi Second Division (Level 3)
Runners-up (2): 1985–86, 2009–10

Current squad 
As of 30 September 2022:

Coaches
 Bahaa Aldeen Al-Qebisi 2008-2009
 Idris Obeis 2013-2014
 Abdullah Darwish 2015-2016

References

Jeel
Jeel
Jeel
Jeel